Samada is a township in the Tibet Autonomous Region of China.

See also
List of towns and villages in Tibet

External links

Populated places in Shigatse
Township-level divisions of Tibet